Black Wings is a 1963 Polish drama film directed by Ewa Petelska and Czesław Petelski. It was entered into the 3rd Moscow International Film Festival where it won a Silver Prize.

Cast
 Kazimierz Opaliński as Kostryń, manager of ' Erazm'
 Czesław Wołłejko as Coeur, manager
 Zdzisław Karczewski as Antoni Mieniewski, poseł
 Stanisław Niwiński as Tadeusz Miniewski
 Maria Homerska as Kostryniowa
 Beata Tyszkiewicz as Zuza Kostryniowa
 Tadeusz Fijewski as Falkiewicz, geometra
 Wojciech Siemion as Jan Duś
 Zbigniew Koczanowicz as Martyzel
 Józef Łodyński as Koza, trade-union secretary
 Helena Dąbrowska as Knote
 Edward Wichura as Por. Kapuścik, police commandant
 Stefan Bartik as Supernak
 Bohdana Majda as Miniewska, Antoni's wife
 Michał Leśniak as a miner

References

External links
 

1963 films
1963 drama films
1960s Polish-language films
Polish black-and-white films
Films directed by Ewa Petelska
Films directed by Czesław Petelski
Polish drama films